The Cottonwood Creek Bridge is a bridge over Cottonwood Creek in Colorado Springs, Colorado. The structure is on the National Register of Historic Places.

The bridge was completed on what was a major Colorado north–south road in 1923 and is one of the few long cantilevered, girder bridges in the state from the 1920s. It has a concrete deck and is made of four 53-foot spans. It is made with a  "hammered concrete treatment on the spandrels and cast concrete balusters forming the guardrails."

References

Road bridges on the National Register of Historic Places in Colorado
Colorado State Register of Historic Properties
Buildings and structures in Colorado Springs, Colorado
National Register of Historic Places in Colorado Springs, Colorado
Concrete bridges in the United States
Cantilever bridges in the United States
Girder bridges in the United States
Transportation buildings and structures in El Paso County, Colorado